Arctolamia is a genus of flat-faced longhorn beetles belonging to the family Cerambycidae.

Species
 Arctolamia fasciata Gestro, 1890
 Arctolamia fruhstorferi Aurivillius, 1902
 Arctolamia luteomaculata Pu, 1981
 Arctolamia strandi Breuning, 1936
 Arctolamia villosa Gestro, 1888

References

 Biolib
  Worldwide Cerambycoidea Photo Gallery

Lamiini